Thomas Godfrey (15 January 1904 – 1983) was a Scottish footballer who played in the Football League for Stoke City, Swindon Town and Walsall.

Career
Godfrey began his career with his local club Stenhousemuir before joining English club Stoke City in 1927. He was frequently used as a backup player by Tom Mather during this three years at the Victoria Ground making 10 appearances. He then spent the 1930–31 with Walsall playing 42 times scoring twice. Two poor seasons with Swindon Town followed as the "Robins" failed to make much of an impression in the Third Division South and Godfrey went on to play non-league football with Folkestone and Worcester City.

Career statistics
Source:

References

Scottish footballers
Stoke City F.C. players
Swindon Town F.C. players
Walsall F.C. players
English Football League players
1904 births
1983 deaths
Association football defenders